Edward Marsden (25 July 1870 – 2 July 1946) was an English cricketer. He was a left-handed batsman and a left-arm fast bowler who played for Middlesex. He was born in Belsize Park and died in Hampstead.

Marsden made a single first-class appearance for the team, in 1897, against the Gentlemen of Philadelphia. Batting in the tail-end, he scored 3 runs in the only innings in which he batted. He bowled 21 overs in the match, taking 1–45 in the first innings and 0–23 in the second.

References

External links
Edward Marsden at CricketArchive

1870 births
1946 deaths
People from Belsize Park
English cricketers
Middlesex cricketers